Pyrrha Design is a jewelry design and manufacturing company based in Vancouver, British Columbia, Canada.

Background 
Founded by Wade Papin and Danielle Wilmore in 1995 in Vancouver, Canada, Pyrrha designs and creates sustainable jewelry based on antique wax seals and heraldic talismans. 

The company name derives from Greek mythology, specifically from the story of Pyrrha and Deucalion. 

In April 2010, Pyrrha opened its first retail store in Los Angeles, California.

Pyrrha Design is a member of the Responsible Jewelry Council and 1% for the planet.

References

External links 
 Pyrrha's website

Jewellery companies of Canada
Manufacturing companies based in Vancouver